Guille is both a surname and a given name. Notable people with the name include:

Surname
Cédric Guille (born 1978), French artistic gymnast
Derek Guille (born 1951), Australian radio presenter
John Guille (born 1949), British Anglican priest

Given name
Guille Garcia (born 1947), Cuban-born American musician
Guille López (born 1992), Spanish footballer
Guille Rubio (born 1982), Spanish basketball player
Guille Smitarello (born 1993), Spanish footballer